D.A.M.A (acronym of Deixa-me Aclarar-te a Mente Amigo (Portuguese) and stylized as D.Δ.M.A or DAMA, is a Portuguese pop band from Lisbon.

Discography

Albums

Singles

Awards and nominations

References

External links 

 

Portuguese musical groups
Portuguese boy bands
Golden Globes (Portugal) winners